Kudahuraa as a place name may refer to:
 Kudahuraa (Kaafu Atoll) (Republic of Maldives)
 Kudahuraa (Laamu Atoll) (Republic of Maldives)